Lord of the Flies is a 1990 American survival drama film directed by Harry Hook and starring Balthazar Getty, Chris Furrh, Danuel Pipoly, and James Badge Dale. It was produced by Lewis M. Allen and written by Jay Presson Allen under the pseudonym "Sara Schiff", based on the 1954 book Lord of the Flies, by William Golding. It is the second film adaptation of the book, after Lord of the Flies (1963).

The film differs in many ways from both its predecessor film and the novel. Lord of the Flies centers on Ralph mainly, as the children try to initiate a society after crash-landing on an uncharted island, but things go awry.

The film was released on March 16, 1990, by Columbia Pictures,. Upon and since its release, the film has received mixed reviews, generally more negative than its 1963 counterpart. Most critics praise the film's performances and scenery but center upon the film's deviations from the novel as a central flaw. It was also a box-office bomb, grossing $13 million domestically.

Plot
An aircraft carrying 24 American military school cadet boys returning home ditches near an uninhabited jungle island in the Pacific Ocean. Captain Benson, the pilot of the plane and the only adult survivor, is seriously injured and delirious. During the night, Simon, the most independent cadet, finds a river and notifies the other boys, which they all drink from and explore the island afterwards. Meanwhile, on the beach, an overweight cadet nicknamed "Piggy", finds a conch seashell and takes it to the grouped cadets, who adopt it to signal the right to speak and be heard by the group. The senior cadet, Cadet Colonel Ralph, organizes a meeting to discuss surviving their predicament. Ralph and another of the older boys, Jack, emerge dominant, and an impromptu election is held to determine an official leader for the group. Ralph is declared the winner. They start a fire using Piggy's glasses to try and alert any passing craft. Things go smoothly for a while, but tensions soon begin to grow between Ralph and Jack.

One night, as they sleep, Jack brings all of his hunters to hunt in the jungle, leaving no one watching the fire. The fire goes out, preventing a passing helicopter from noticing them. Ralph confronts Jack for failing to keep it going. During the ensuing fight, Jack, tired of listening to Ralph and Piggy, leaves and forms his own camp, taking many of the boys with him. As more and more boys defect to Jack's side, Sam and Eric see the dead parachutist, mistake it for the beast, and then tell the other boys. 

One night, Jack and his savages steal Piggy’s glasses, but accidentally trample on them in the process, breaking one lens. Expecting to be rescued, Ralph's civilized leadership establishes a permanent signal-fire to alert passing ships of their presence on the island. Not expecting or wanting to be rescued, Jack's savage leadership adapts to circumstance; he establishes his camp as spear-bearing hunters who provide meat for both camps. They kill a wild pig and leave its head as an offering to the "monster" that they believe is in the cave. Eventually, identical twins Sam and Eric, two of Ralph's friends, leave him to join Jack's tribe, leaving Ralph with only Piggy and Simon left.

Meanwhile, Simon finds the pig's head on the stick. He then uses a glow stick to explore the cave and discovers the corpse of Capt. Benson. Simon realizes the boys mistook Capt. Benson for a monster and runs to the beach in an attempt to alert them of his discovery, but his waving of the glow stick frightens the other boys, who mistake him for the monster and stab him to death with their spears. The following morning, Ralph blames himself and Piggy for not stopping the hunters from killing Simon. Afterwards, Jack tells his gang that the "beast" can come in any different form.

After Piggy's glasses are stolen by Jack's savages that night so they could make fire, Piggy and Ralph travel to Jack's camp at Castle Rock, attempting to call a meeting using the conch. Piggy insists that everyone be sensible and work together, but Jack's savages refuse to listen. As Piggy speaks, Roger pushes a boulder off a cliff which falls on Piggy's head, killing him instantly. Ralph swears revenge, but Jack and his hunters drive Ralph away by throwing rocks at him. Later that night, Ralph secretly returns to Castle Rock to visit Sam and Eric, who warn him that the hunters will chase after Ralph on Jack's orders.

The following morning, Jack and his hunters begin setting the jungle on fire to force Ralph out of hiding and kill him. Just barely dodging the spreading fire and Jack's hunters, Ralph makes a desperate run to the sea. He falls onto the beach, where he encounters a United States Marine Corps officer pilot who has just landed on the island with other Marines after having seen the fire that engulfed much of the island. As a horrified Jack and his hunters watch in stunned silence, they reflect upon their savage behavior while Ralph breaks into tears.

Cast
 Balthazar Getty as Ralph
 Chris Furrh as Jack
 Danuel Pipoly as Piggy
 James Badge Dale as Simon
 Andrew Taft as Sam
 Edward Taft as Eric
 Gary Rule as Roger
 Michael Greene as Captain Benson
 Bob Peck as U.S. Marine Corps Officer

Production
The filming was done on location at Portland Parish in Jamaica, particularly at Snow Hill and Frenchman's Cove, in the summer of 1988. Additional filming locations included Hamakua Coast; Kaua'i; Hana, Maui (in Hawaii) and the Los Angeles County Arboretum and Botanic Garden.

For a sequence filmed on the Hamakua Coast, it was determined that the child actors were too short to film shots where they needed to walk through long grass, so taller body doubles were instead used to film this sequence. A casting call was sent to find the body doubles, and they were all cast within forty-eight hours.

The child members cast were relatively inexperienced. Balthazar Getty (Ralph) and James Badge Dale (Simon) were the only child actors who went on to have successful acting careers, as with James Aubrey, who played Ralph, and Nicholas Hammond, who played Roger, in the film version of 1963.

Sara Schiff/Jay Presson Allen 
The screenplay is credited to Sara Schiff. Schiff is the pseudonym of author Jay Presson Allen. The screenplay was her last film work before her death in 2006. She was reportedly dissatisfied by the final product and had her name removed, hence the attribution to a pseudonym. Presson-Allen was also producer Lewis M. Allen's wife.

The trick in adapting, Allen said in a 1972 interview with The New York Times, "is not to throw out the baby with the bath water. You can change all kinds of things, but don't muck around with the essence".

Release

Box office
Lord of the Flies was released theatrically on March 16, 1990, in the United States by Columbia Pictures. Upon release, the film made $4.4 million in 888 theaters. It debuted at No.3 behind The Hunt for Red October and Joe Versus the Volcano. The film closed from theaters with a complete domestic gross of $13.9 million.

Critical reception
Lord of the Flies received mixed reviews from critics, providing mixed assessments of the performances of the various actors while praising its scenery. The review aggregator Rotten Tomatoes reported that 57% of critics have given the film a positive review based on 21 reviews, with an average rating of 6.40/10. On Metacritic, the film has a weighted average score of 49 out of 100 based on 20 critic reviews, indicating "mixed or average reviews".

Most heavily criticized was the way in which the filmmakers departed from the novel. Richard Alleva of Crisis Magazine criticized the portrayal of the first assembly on the island, a crucial moment in the book, as "anticlimactic" in the film. He lamented the fact that the conversation that Simon imagines taking place between himself and the pig, or the "Lord of the Flies", yet another of the book's most pivotal moments, was in the movie reduced to only a few moments of Simon staring at the pig. Alleva also criticized what he saw as misrepresentations of Ralph and Jack, believing that the movie downplayed Ralph's imperfections as presented in the book and amplified those of Jack. He said that "In this film, the good boys are too good; the bad boys too quickly bad, and bad in the wrong way."

Some have claimed that the novel in general is somewhat dated and unsuitable for a remake. Roger Ebert remarked in his review that "events take place every day on our mean streets that are more horrifying than anything the little monsters do to one another on Golding's island."

PopMatters journalist J.C. Maçek III wrote favorably about the performances of the movie's central actors but commented that "[t]he lessons and allusions of the novel and first adaptation feel heavy-handed and far too obvious in this remake. In short, while the 1963 film, in its black and white darkness, brings the viewer into the film with depth and shock, the 1990 movie is the experience of watching actors reciting lines and making a movie."

Barrie Maxwell of DVD Verdict commented that the color of the island creates a more superficial atmosphere than the stark black and white of the previous version.

Janet Maslin of the New York Times wrote the following in a 1990 review:

References

External links

 
 
 
 
 
 Lord of the Flies at the Movie Review Query Engine

1990 films
1990 drama films
1990s American films
1990s coming-of-age drama films
1990s English-language films
American coming-of-age drama films
American dystopian films
American remakes of British films
American survival films
Castle Rock Entertainment films
Columbia Pictures films
Films about aviation accidents or incidents
Films about children
Films based on British novels
Films scored by Philippe Sarde
Films set in the Pacific Ocean
Films set on uninhabited islands
Films shot in Hawaii
Murder in films